John Wroe (19 September 1782 – 5 February 1863) was a British evangelist who founded the Christian Israelite Church in the 1820s after having what he believed were a series of  visions.

Biography 
Wroe was born, on 19 September 1782, in the village of East Bowling, near Bradford, West Yorkshire to a worsted manufacturer and farmer, and baptised an Anglican. After a rather scanty education, he entered his father's business, but later took a farm. He married and brought up a family of seven children.

In 1819 Wroe became ill with a fever and two doctors who attended him considered his life was in serious danger. Wroe asked for a minister to come and pray with him. Although his wife sent for four church ministers, each refused his request. Wroe then asked his wife to read a few chapters of the Bible to him, and after a while, he gradually recovered his bodily health, but his mental distress continued and he "wrestled with God" day and night for some months.

A short time later, Wroe started having visions, and often became blind and unable to speak — on one occasion remaining blind for six days. During these periods, Wroe said, many remarkable events were foretold and revealed to him: the Spirit told him to relinquish his worldly employment, so he devoted his life to travelling and preaching, where he gained many followers and persuaded them that he was a messenger of God.

Wroe, although often persecuted and threatened, travelled throughout Europe including Gibraltar, Spain, France, Germany, Italy, Scotland, and Wales. He later travelled to the United States, and Australia.

The Christian Israelite Church was originally set up in Ashton-under-Lyne, Lancashire and from 1822 to 1831 the town was the church's headquarters. In the 1820s the church trustees wanted to turn Ashton-under-Lyne into a "new Jerusalem". They intended to build a wall around the town with four gateways, and although the wall was never constructed, the four gatehouses were, as was a printing press. These plans failed when the Trustees were replaced and the church headquarters moved to Gravesend in Kent in the 1830s. Popular opinion in Ashton turned against Wroe when, in 1831, he was accused of indecent behaviour, but the charges were dismissed. The church spread to Australia, where it is still active.

Wroe died in Melbourne, Australia, in 1863, aged 81, leaving the church affairs in the hands of his trustees.

Cultural depictions and legacy
Wroe’s life was the basis of a novel, Mr Wroe's Virgins by Jane Rogers. In 1993 Jonathan Pryce featured as Wroe, alongside Kathy Burke and Minnie Driver, in a BBC mini-series adaptation of the novel directed by Danny Boyle.

Most of the locations that are associated with Wroe are long gone, although one of his ‘gatehouses’ does survive in the form of former "Odd Whim" public house in Park Square, Mossley Road, Ashton-under-Lyne, now converted into offices and flats. On the front of the property is a blue plaque commemorating Wroe, although it wrongly claims that he was banished from the town and fled to Australia.

References

Bibliography

External links
 John Wroe at ODNB
 John Wroe on utopia-britannica
 Christian Israelite Church
 Historical Website of Wroe Descendants
 New York Times article mentioning John Wroe published June 26, 1855
 History Website of the Christian Israelite Church

1782 births
1863 deaths
19th-century apocalypticists
19th-century Protestants
English evangelicals
Clergy from Bradford
Cult leaders
Prophets